The Clausura 2014 season is the 34th edition of El Salvador's Primera División de Fútbol de El Salvador since its establishment of an Apertura and Clausura format. Isidro Metapán were the defending champions. The league will consist of 10 teams, each playing a home and away game against the other clubs for a total of 18 games, respectively. The top four teams at the end of the regular season will take part of the playoffs.

Team information
A total of 10 teams will contest the league

Stadia and locations

Personnel and sponsoring

Managerial changes

Before the start of the season

During the season

League table

Results

Scoring 
First goal of the season:  William Maldonado for Santa Tecla F.C. against UES, 10 minutes (17 January 2015)
Fastest goal in a match: TBD minute -  TBD for TBD against TBD (TBD TBD 2015)
Goal scored at the latest point in a match: 94 minutes -  Elman Rivas for UES against Santa Tecla F.C. (17 January 2015) 
First penalty Kick of the season:  Elman Rivas for UES against Santa Tecla F.C., 56 minutes (17 January  2015)
Widest winning margin: 4 goals
Alianza F.C. 4–0 C.D. Pasaquina (2015)
First hat-trick of the season: Ricardo de Ferreria for Santa Tecla F.C. against Juventud Independiente (TBD TBD 2015)
First own goal of the season: TBD (TBD) for TBD (2015)
Most goals in a match: 7 Goals C.D. Aguila 4–3 A.D. Isidro Metapan (2015)
Most goals by one team in a match: 4 Goals
C.D. Aguila 5–1 C.D. Dragon (TBD 2015) 
Most goals in one half by one team: 4 Goals C.D. Aguila 5–1 C.D. Dragon (2015)
Most goals scored by losing team: 3 Goals
A.D. Isidro Metapan 3–4 C.D. Aguila (2015)
Most goals by one player in a single match: 3 Goals
 Ricardo de Ferreria for Santa Tecla F.C. against Juventud Independiente (January 2015)
 Nicolas Munoz for C.D. Aguila against A.D. Isidro Metapan (1 February 2015)

Top goalscorers

Playoffs

Semi-finals

First leg

Second leg

Isidro Metapan won 2–1 on aggregate.

Santa Tecla won 6–4 on aggregate.

Final

List of foreign players in the league
This is a list of foreign players in Clausura 2014. The following players:
have played at least one apertura game for the respective club.
have not been capped for the El Salvador national football team on any level, independently from the birthplace

A new rule was introduced a few season ago, that clubs can only have three foreign players per club and can only add a new player if there is an injury or player/s is released.

C.D. Águila
  Eder Arias
  Miguel Camargo
  TBD

Alianza F.C.
  Jorge Drovandi
  Matías Córdoba
  Jonathan Philippe

Atlético Marte
  Nestor Asprilla
  Martín García
  Agustin Adorni

C.D. Dragón
  Jhony Rios
  Jimmy Valoyes
  Sean Fraser

Juventud Independiente
  Yohance Marshall
   Juan Díaz 
  Andrés Giraldo

C.D. FAS
  Glauber Rodrigues
  Alejandro Bentos
  Julián Di Cosmo
  Cristian González 

A.D. Isidro Metapán
  Héctor Ramos
   David López
  Romeo Parkes

Pasaquina
  Glaúber da Silva
  Samuel Kordell

Santa Tecla F.C.
  Rodrigo de Brito
  Ricardinho
  Ignacio Colombo

UES
  Garrick Gordon
  Francisco Ladogano
  Santiago Davio

 (player released during the season)

Aggregate table

External links

Primera División de Fútbol Profesional Clausura seasons
El
1